Michael T. Scott is an American comedy writer, animation director and creator of the Happy Fatties online cartoon series, which has been featured on several notable web video sites including, YouTube, Dailymotion, Yahoo! Video, Openfilm, Animation World Network, Crackle, Aniboom, Funny or Die and Newgrounds. He is also well-known and famous for producing the television series titled Kentucky Fried Memories.

Scott also wrote and produced 3 comedy albumswhich are Pre-chewed Appetizers and The Jim Panzee and Friends Funtime Radio Hour.

Happy Fatties
Since 2009, Scott has created over 90 animated comedy shorts, and received over 4 million views online for his Happy Fatties cartoons. Additional to being featured on several of the online video sites mentioned above, Scott's Happy Fatties series was also featured on Frederator's Channel on the YouTube Original Channel Initiative. He was interviewed on Frederator Studios' blog in August 2011. Ain't It Cool News also featured a Happy Fatties short in January 2013. Some of the most viewed Happy Fatties cartoons, based on accumulated YouTube views are Eat Healthy, Kids!, Humpty Dumpty: Kindergarten Kritic, The Lazy Chef: Spaghetti Dinner, Killer Whales: Confessions, and Social Assassin.

In 2013, Scott relocated from Tennessee to Colorado, and partnered with animation company, Worker Studio, as the studio's Head of Story from February to December. The partnership placed Scott's entire library of Happy Fatties cartoons under Worker Studio's original content. The partnership formed at the Business incubator in Centennial, Colorado, Innovation Pavilion.

Phil Hartman Fan Letter
In 2011, Scott posted a handwritten letter online that he received in 1997 from Phil Hartman, and the letter went viral. Through the attention of this letter, Scott connected with Hartman's family and in May 2013, Worker Studio optioned the rights to develop Phil Hartman's Flat TV, but withdrew the option later in August. While the reasons behind this remain unknown, the letter left Scott in a deep emotional state.

References

1977 births
Living people
American comedy writers
American animators
American animated film directors
American male voice actors
People from Queens, New York